Wykes is a very old surname from an English origin. The current distribution of Wykes' tends to be in the UK and the former British Colonies. There are Wykes' living in the United Kingdom, Australia, United States, Canada, New Zealand and even India .

Variants 
Over centuries the surname has changed and now has variants. Some of the present-day variants include Wecks, Week, Weeks, Whicks, Whikes, Whykes, Wick, Wickes, Wicks, Wix, Wycha and Wyke. It is likely that one source of the name originates in Saxon times. A wyke was the Saxon term for a dairying hamlet, or small village.

History 
Wykes is not a common surname, but it is definitely an old one. That it is an English name seems certain, although some of the alternate spellings have more recent Scandinavian or continental Germanic origins. Wykes was one of the original 5 or 6 pre-Norman surnames in England.

The earliest written record of the name is in the Anglo Saxon Chronicle of AD 1002 which mentions one Sygmund Wycha, "freeholder and huntsman".

Elizabeth Wykes was the daughter of Henry Wykes of Putney, Surrey, a shearman who later became a gentleman usher to Henry VII.

Notable Wykes' 

Some notable Wykes' include Walter Wykes (American playwright and actor), Thomas Wykes (English chronicler), Ted Wykes (Australian cricket Test match umpire), and Sarah Wykes (British human rights activist).

References
 Surname Genealogy Search

External links
 The World WYKES Web

Surnames